The tubal branch of uterine artery is an artery anastamosing with the tubal branches of the ovarian artery.

References

Arteries of the abdomen